Adrianus ("Aad") Johannes Bak (Rotterdam, South Holland, 18 June 1926 - 16 January 2009 Schiedam, South Holland) was a Dutch professional football player.

Club career
Bak started his career in the team of Excelsior. He played for Holland Sport during the 1954–55 season. Between 1955 and 1962, he played in the midfielder position for Feijenoord. While there, he won two Dutch national championships, in 1961 and 1962.

International career
Bak received his only cap in the Netherlands national football team in 1956.

References

External links

1926 births
2009 deaths
Footballers from Rotterdam
Association football midfielders
Dutch footballers
Netherlands international footballers
SVV Scheveningen players
Feyenoord players
Eredivisie players